Muskowekwan 85-29 is an Indian reserve of the Muskowekwan First Nation in Saskatchewan. It is 107 kilometres west of Yorkton. In the 2016 Canadian Census, it recorded a population of 5 living in 2 of its 3 total private dwellings.

References

Indian reserves in Saskatchewan
Division No. 10, Saskatchewan